Wolfgang Sartorius Freiherr von Waltershausen (17 December 180916 March 1876) was a German geologist.

Life and work
Waltershausen was born at Göttingen and educated at this city's university. There he devoted his attention to physical and natural science, and in particular to mineralogy. Waltershausen was named after Johann Wolfgang von Goethe, who was close friends with his parents. Waltershausen's father, Georg, was a writer, lecturer and professor of economics and history at Göttingen. Georg Sartorius (later Sartorius von Waltershausen) is best known in his role of translator and popularizer of Adam Smith's Wealth of Nations. His son, August, was a well known economist who specialized in American economy, and had at least one of his books translated into English.

During a tour in 1834–1835 Waltershausen carried out a series of magnetic observations in various parts of Europe. He then gave his attention to an exhaustive investigation of the volcano of Mount Etna, in Sicily,  and carried on the work with some interruptions until 1843 including with Christian Heinrich Friedrich Peters. The chief result of this undertaking was his great Atlas des Ätna (1858–1861), in which he distinguished the lava streams formed during the later centuries.

After his return from Mount Etna, Waltershausen visited Iceland, and subsequently published Physisch-geographische Skizze von Island (1847), Über die vulkanischen Gesteine in Sizilien und Island (1853), and Geologischer Atlas von Island (1853). Meanwhile, he was appointed professor of mineralogy and geology at Göttingen, and held this post for about thirty years, until his death.

In 1866 Waltershausen  published an important essay entitled Recherches sur les climats de l'époque actuelle et des époques anciennes; in this he expressed his belief that the Ice age was due to changes in the configuration of the Earth's surface. He died at Göttingen.

In 1880, Arnold von Lasaulx edited Waltershausen notes and published the book Der Aetna (cover page pictured).

Gauss zum Gedächtnis
Waltershausen was also the author of Gauss zum Gedächtnis, in 1856.  This biography, published upon the death of Carl Friedrich Gauss, is viewed as Gauss's biography as Gauss wished it to be told.  It is also the source of one of the most famous mathematical quotes: Mathematics is the queen of the sciences. and the famous story of Gauss as a young boy quickly finding the sum of a long string of consecutive numbers

When  Gauss died in Göttingen, two individuals gave eulogies at his funeral: Gauss's son-in-law Heinrich Ewald, and Waltershausen who represented the faculty in Göttingen.

Commemorations
The mineral Sartorite as well as the Waltershausen Glacier in Northeast Greenland  were named in his honour.

Notes

External links
 
 
 Digitized English Translation of Waltershausen book on Gauss, Gauss zum Gedächtnis, 1856.
  - Satorite Mineral Page
  - 2nd Satorite Mineral Page
  - Discussion of Waltershausen as source on Gauss numbers story including partial translation of Waltershausen book on Gauss [American Scientist online    Volume 94 Number: 3 Page 200  Gauss's Day of Reckoning: A famous story about the boy wonder of mathematics has taken on a life of its own, Brian Hayes]
  Peters' information
  - Waltershausen's parents' page and information on Waltershausen family website
  - Waltershausen's son's page and information on Waltershausen family website

1809 births
1876 deaths
University of Göttingen alumni
Barons of Germany
German mineralogists
German volcanologists
Scientists from Göttingen
Academic staff of the University of Göttingen